The Union for the Nation (UN) is a Congolese electoral bloc formed by over 50 opposition supporters of Jean-Pierre Bemba, who was the major candidate in the 2006 presidential election and succeeding run-off against Joseph Kabila and is now a member of the Senate. 

It was originally constituted as the Group of Congolese Nationalists (RENACO) for Bemba's presidential candidacy. After Bemba lost the election, RENACO was re-constituted as the Union for the Nation with a more specific focus on nationalism and populism. It is a minority bloc in both the Senate (with 21 out of 108 seats) and National Assembly (with 116 out of 500 seats), only holds 1 governorship (in Équateur, Bemba's home province) and competes with the Alliance of the Presidential Majority, which is a majority bloc that supports Kabila.

Member parties
Movement for the Liberation of the Congo
Union for the Congo's Reconstruction, led by Dr. Oscar Kashala

Congolese nationalism (Democratic Republic of the Congo)
Political party alliances in the Democratic Republic of the Congo